Berber or Berbers may refer to:

Ethnic group
 Berbers, an ethnic group native to Northern Africa
 Berber languages, a family of Afro-Asiatic languages

Places
 Berber, Sudan, a town on the Nile

People with the surname
 Ady Berber (1913–1966), Austrian film actor
 Alejandro Berber (born 1987), Mexican footballer
 Anita Berber (1899–1928), German dancer, actress, and writer
 Fatiha Berber (1945–2015), Algerian actress
 Felix Berber (1871–1930), German violinist
 Fritz Berber (1898–1984), member of the Nazi administration in Germany until 1943
 Kübra Berber (born 1996), Turkish women's footballer
 Mersad Berber (1940–2012), Bosnian painter
 Oğuzhan Berber (born 1992), Turkish footballer
 Philip Berber (born 1958), Irish American entrepreneur and philanthropist
 Yolande Berbers, Belgian computer scientist
 , born 1987), Russian actress

Other uses
 Berber carpet, a type of carpet hand-woven by the Berber autochthones in North Africa and the Sahara
 Berber the Moor, a fictional character in The Bastard Executioner

See also
 Barbaria (East Africa) or Bilad-al-Barbar, the ancient and medieval name of Somalia
 Berbera, a port city in Somalia
 Berbere, a spice mixture from Ethiopia

Language and nationality disambiguation pages